Paul Tierney (born 1982 in Blackrock, County Cork) is an Irish sportsperson and fell runner. He played hurling with his local club Blackrock and was a member of the Cork senior inter-county team from 2003 until 2004.

In 2015 Tierney won the Lakeland 100, a 100-mile ultramarathon through trails in the Lake District National Park; he completed the race in 20 hours 42 minutes. He is now a running coach based in Cumbria specialising in natural running techniques.

He has three times finished the 330 km Tor des Géants in the Aosta Valley in less than 100 hours (99:09 in 2017, 94:39 in 2018 and 88:05 in 2021).

On 20 June 2019 he broke the record for running the 214 Wainwright summits, completing in 6 days 6 hours 4 minutes and beating Steve Birkinshaw's previous record.

References

1982 births
Living people
Blackrock National Hurling Club hurlers
Cork inter-county hurlers
Irish male long-distance runners
Irish mountain runners
Irish ultramarathon runners
Fell runners
Peak bagging in the United Kingdom